Four Mile (also known as FourMile) is an unincorporated community in Franklin Township, Jackson County, Ohio, United States.

References 

Unincorporated communities in Jackson County, Ohio